The Real Estate is a 2018 Swedish drama film co-directed by Axel Petersén and Måns Månsson. It was selected to compete for the Golden Bear in the main competition section at the 68th Berlin International Film Festival.

Cast
 Léonore Ekstrand
 Christer Levin
 Christian Saldert
 Olof Rhodin

References

External links
 
 
 

2018 films
2018 drama films
Swedish drama films
2010s Swedish-language films
2010s Swedish films